Phyllonorycter watanabei is a moth of the family Gracillariidae. It is known from the islands of Hokkaido, Shikoku, Honshu and Kyushu in Japan and from the Russian Far East.

The wingspan is 5.5–6 mm.

The larvae feed as leaf miners on Pourthiaea villosa and Pyrus ussuriensis. The mine is ptychonomous and located in the space between two veins of the lower surface of the leaf.

References

watanabei
Moths of Japan
Moths of Asia

Moths described in 1963
Taxa named by Tosio Kumata
Leaf miners